Sing Buri (or Singburi) may refer to
the town Sing Buri
Sing Buri Province
Sing Buri district